The Dienten Saddle is a mountain col at a height of 1342 m in the Austrian federal state of Salzburg. The pass is open all-year round and traversed by the Hochkönig Road (B 164) that links Bischofshofen in the east with Saalfelden in the west. Between these two places there is also the Filzen Saddle.

References 

Mountain passes of the Alps
Salzburg Slate Alps
Berchtesgaden Alps
Mountain passes of Salzburg (state)
St. Johann im Pongau District